This is a list of puthis written in the historic Sylheti Nagri script. This does not include works dating after the late 20th century.

1600s
 Bhedsar (ভেদসার) by Syed Shah Husayn Alam

1700s
 Talib Husan (তালিব হুছন) by Ghulam Husan (1774, Silchar)

1800s
 Ghafil Nasihat (গাফিল নছিহত) by Azmat Ali (1843, Umairgaon, Sylhet) 
 Halat-un-Nabi (হালতুন্নবী) by Sadeq Ali (1855, Daulatpur, Longla)
 Kitab Radd-e-Kufr (কেতাব রদ্দে কুফুর) by Sadeq Ali (1874, Sylhet) 
 Saheeh Sohor Chorit (ছহী সহর চরিত) by Asad (1878, Sylhet) 
 Shitalong Faqir-er Rag (শিতালং ফকিরের রাগ) by Muhammad Salimullah, aka Shitalong Shah (Kazidahar, Sonai) 
 Puthi Dafeh al-Hujat (পুঁথি দফেউল হুজত) by Sadeq Ali
 Pandenama (পান্দেনামা) by Sadeq Ali
 Hashor Michhil (হাশর মিছিল) by Sadeq Ali
 Hushiarnama (হুঁশিয়ারনামা) by Sadeq Ali
 Ozu-Namaz (অজু-নমাজ) by Munshi Abdul Karim 
 Kalam Darbesh (কালাম দরবেশ) 
 Asol Kitab Mohabbatnama (আসল কেতাব মহবতনামা) by Sadeq Ali
 Kitab Saheeh Sadsi Mas'ala o 130 Faraz (কেতাব ছহি ছদছি মছলা ও ১৩০ ফরজ) by Munshi Abdul Karim (1890, Sylhet) 
 Shahadat-e-Buzurgan (শাহাদতে বুজুর্গান) by Mozir Uddin Ahmed (Atuwajan, Saidpur, Sunamganj)

1900s
 Wajib al-Amal (ওয়াজিবুল আমল) by 'Abd al-Karim of Jaintiapur (1905, Calcutta) 
 Kitab Nur-najat - Dar Ishq-e-Marefat (কেতাব নুরনাজাত - দর এস্কে মারেফত) by Zuhur al-Husayn (1907, Sylhet) 
 Mujma Rag Haribangsha (মুজমা রাগ হরিবংশ) by Muhammad Afzal (1907, Sylhet) 
 Mufid al-Mumineen: Volume 1 (মুফীদুল মুমিনীন) by Munshi Irfan Ali (1910, Sylhet)
 Puthi Apai Nama (পুঁথি আপাই নামা) by Munshi Sajid Miya (1913, Sylhet) )
 Ahwal-e-Zamana (আহওয়ালে জমানা) by Muhammad Haidar Chaudhuri (1913, Sylhet) 
 Hajjnama (হজনামা) by Sriyukta Saha Abdullah (1913, Sylhet) 
 Ahkam al-Islam (আহকামুল ইছলাম) by Munshi Muhammad Husan (1913, Sylhet) 
 Kitab Ganj-e-Ishq-e-Ilahi (কেতাব গঞ্জে এস্কে এলাহি) by Munshi Abdul Aziz (1916, Sylhet) 
 Waqf-e-Islamia Puthi (অকফে ইসলামিয়া পুঁথি) by Unknown (1916, Dhalai) 
 Saheeh Wasitunnabi (ছহি অছিতুন্নবী) by Munshi Zafar Ali (1920, Sylhet) 
 Charkar Fazilat (চরকার ফজিলত) by Muhammad Sikandar Ali (1921, Sylhet) 
 Ahkam-e-Charka (আহকামে চরকা) by Moulvi Akbar Ali (1922, Sylhet) 
 Zulmat Nama Kobita (জুলমাত নামা কবিতা) by Munshi Mushahid Ali (1924, Silchar) 
 Rag Wajid Nasihat (রাগ ওয়াজিদ নছিহত) by Moulvi Surukh Miya Choudhury (1924, Sylhet) 
 Saheeh Mufid al-Awam (ছহি মুফিদুল আওয়াম) by Munshi Abdul Aziz (1925, Sylhet) 
 Shat Konna-r Bakhan (সাত কন্যার বাখান) by Saha Noor (1925, Sylhet) 
 Shonabhan-er Puthi (সোনাভানের পুঁথি) by Abdul Karim (1925, Sylhet) 
 Korinama (কড়িনামা) by Unknown (1927, Sylhet) 
 Isar al-Haqq (ইছারুল হক) by Faqir Haji Asan Shah (1927–28, Sylhet) 
 Ahkam-e-Roza (আহকামে রোজা) by Moulvi Faiyaz Ali (1929, Sylhet) 
 Horin Nama (হরিণ নামা) (1929, Sylhet) 
 Sylhet Nagri Pohela Kitab O Doikhura-r Rag (সিলেট নাগরী পহেলা কিতাব ও দইখুরার রাগ) by Muhammad Abdul Latif (1929, Sylhet) 
 Europiyo Mohajuddher Kobita Volume 2 (ইউরোপীয় মহাযুদ্ধের কবিতা) by Abdul Wahid al-Adiri al-Hanafi (1950)

Unknown
 Jongonama by Wahid Ali 
 Surman Ali Khalifa-r Gaan by Surman Ali 
 Shahid-e-Karbala 
 Ebadat-e-Magaz 
 Spiritual Songs on Love and Separation 
 Hormuz Ali-r Gaan by Shah Hormuz Ali 
 Baram Zohura 
 Bayan Qayamatnama 
 Chandramukhi-r Punthi 
 Imamsurir Bayan 
 Hormuz Nasihat

See also
History of Sylhet
List of Sylhetis
Sylhet region
Sylheti language

References

Sylheti Nagri
Sylhet Division
Sylheti language